Tunkhannock Creek Viaduct (also known as the Nicholson Bridge and the Tunkhannock Viaduct) is a concrete deck arch bridge on the Nicholson Cutoff rail segment of the Norfolk Southern Railway Sunbury Line that spans Tunkhannock Creek in Nicholson, Pennsylvania.

Built by the Delaware, Lackawanna and Western Railroad (DL&W), the bridge is owned today by Norfolk Southern Railway and is used daily for regular through freight service.

The DL&W built the viaduct as part of its  Nicholson Cutoff, which replaced a winding and hilly section of the route between Scranton, Pennsylvania, and Binghamton, New York, saving , 21 minutes of passenger train time, and one hour of freight train time. The bridge was designed by the DL&W's Abraham Burton Cohen; other key DL&W staff were G. J. Ray, chief engineer; F. L. Wheaton, engineer of construction; and C. W. Simpson, resident engineer in charge of the construction. The contractor was Flickwir & Bush, including general manager F. M. Talbot and superintendent W. C. Ritner.

In 1975 the American Society of Civil Engineers or ASCE designated the bridge as a National Historic Civil Engineering Landmark. ASCE noted that at the time of its construction from 1912 to 1915, it was the largest reinforced concrete railroad bridge ever built. The bridge was also listed on the National Register of Historic Places on May 3, 1977. In 1990, the National Railway Historical Society placed a historical plaque on the structure noting its size as the world's largest concrete bridge, completing the Summit cut-off project for the Delaware, Lackawanna and Western Railroad.

History 
In total, excavation for the viaduct removed  of material, more than half of that rock.

Almost half of the bulk of the bridge is underground.

The bridge was dedicated on November 6, 1915, along with the opening of the Nicholson Cutoff.

Construction photos along with a short history of the bridge were published by the Nicholson Area Library in a brochure in 1976. It was listed on the National Register of Historic Places on April 11, 1977.

Since 1990, the local community has celebrated the building of the bridge on the second Sunday of September with "Nicholson Bridge Day", a street fair, parade, and other activities. The 100th-anniversary celebration was held in September 2015.

Recognition

In 1975 the American Society of Civil Engineers or ASCE designated the bridge as a National Historic Civil Engineering Landmark. ASCE noted that at the time of its construction from 1912 to 1915, it was the largest reinforced concrete railroad bridge ever built. ASCE recognized the bridge as "not only a great feat of construction skill" but also a "bold and successful departure from contemporary, conventional concepts of railroad location in that it carried a mainline transversely to the regional drainage pattern, effectively reducing the distance and grade impediments...". At the time the decision was made to build the bridge out of reinforced concrete, railroad engineers had little experience with this material.  The bridge was also listed on the National Register of Historic Places on May 3, 1977. In 1990, the National Railway Historical Society placed a historical plaque on the structure noting its size as the world's largest concrete bridge, completing the Summit cut-off project for the Delaware, Lackawanna and Western Railroad.

Gallery

See also

Starrucca Viaduct
Lackawanna Cut-Off
List of bridges documented by the Historic American Engineering Record in Pennsylvania
National Register of Historic Places listings in Wyoming County, Pennsylvania

References

Further reading

External links

NicholsonBridge.com, enthusiast site about the bridge and its environs

Tunkhannock Viaduct, Historic Civil landmark at the American Society of Civil Engineers site
Norfolk Southern Railway takes over ownership of the Tunkhannock Viaduct in 2015.
A Thing Colossal and Impressive, article by Pennsylvania Center for the book with extensive source listing for the structure.

Open-spandrel deck arch bridges in the United States
Railroad bridges on the National Register of Historic Places in Pennsylvania
Bridges completed in 1915
Viaducts in the United States
Historic Civil Engineering Landmarks
Bridges in Wyoming County, Pennsylvania
Historic American Engineering Record in Pennsylvania
Delaware, Lackawanna and Western Railroad bridges
Concrete bridges in Pennsylvania
Norfolk Southern Railway bridges
National Register of Historic Places in Wyoming County, Pennsylvania